Tero Koskiranta (born June 18, 1984) is a Finnish ice hockey player who currently plays professionally in Germany for Ravensburg Towerstars of the DEL2.

References

External links

1984 births
Living people
Espoo Blues players
SaiPa players
HC TPS players
Finnish ice hockey forwards
People from Paimio
Sportspeople from Southwest Finland